
This is a list of postal codes in Canada where the first letter is K. Postal codes beginning with K are located within the City of Ottawa, and surrounding eastern and central regions of the Canadian province of Ontario. Only the first three characters are listed, corresponding to the Forward Sortation Area.

Canada Post provides a free postal code look-up tool on its website, via its mobile apps for such smartphones as the iPhone and BlackBerry,  and sells hard-copy directories and CD-ROMs. Many vendors also sell validation tools, which allow customers to properly match addresses and postal codes. Hard-copy directories can also be consulted in all post offices, and some libraries.

Eastern Ontario - 84 FSAs

Note: No postal codes begin with K3* or K5*.

Urban

Rural

References
Canada Post map of Ottawa Forward Sortation Areas

Communications in Ontario
K
Postal codes K